Tara Cressida Frances "Finty" Williams (born 24 September 1972) is an English actress.

Life
Williams was born on 24 September 1972 in London, the only child of Judi Dench and Michael Williams. Williams trained at the Central School of Speech and Drama in London, graduating in 1994.

She has one child, a son, Sam, born on 6 June 1997. Her mother, Judi Dench, has said that Williams did not tell her she was going to be a grandmother until days before the birth.

Williams' picture appears in the opening credits of the British romantic comedy television series, starring her mother, As Time Goes By.

Williams was charged with drink-driving in 1998 and 2005. By 2022, she had celebrated her third year of sobriety.

Filmography

Film

Television

Radio
 Doctor Who: Demon Quest - The Demon Of Paris - La Charlotte

Audiobooks
 Hawkmaiden Spellmonger Cadet Series Book One (2019)
 Hawklady Spellmonger Cadet Series Book Two (2019)
 Skyrider Spellmonger Cadet Series Book Three (2019)
 Chain of Gold: The Last Hours Book One (2020)
 Evelina: Or, The History of a Young Lady's Entrance into the World (2016)
 The Girl with All the Gifts (2014)
 I've Got Your Number (2012)
 Lord of Stariel (2018)
 Three Sisters (2021)
 The Tail of Emily Windsnap (2006)
 The Beatryce Prophecy (2021)

Theatre
 Pack of Lies (Menier Chocolate Factory, 2018)
 The Ocean at the End of the Lane'' (UK and Ireland Tour, 2022–2023)

References

External links

1972 births
Living people
20th-century English actresses
21st-century English actresses
Actresses from London
Alumni of the Royal Central School of Speech and Drama
Dench family
English film actresses
English people of Irish descent
English television actresses